Diganth Manchale, mononymously known as Diganth, is an Indian actor and former model. His works are primarily seen in Kannada cinema. Diganth made his acting debut in Miss California in 2006. He is perhaps best known for his performance as "Doodhpeda" paired opposite Neethu in Gaalipata (2008). His performances for the films such as Pancharangi (2010), Lifeu Ishtene (2011) and Parijatha (2012) earned him fame.

Personal life 
Diganth Manchale was born in Sagara, Karnataka. He completed schooling in Seva Bharathi and pre-university in Tunga Mahavidyalaya, Thirthahalli. His father, Krishnamurthy, is a professor, and his mother is Mallika. Diganth has an elder brother, Akash Manchale. He completed his bachelor's degree in Commerce from Sri Bhagawan Mahaveer Jain College, a part of Jain University in Bengaluru, and was a model before joining the Kannada film industry in 2006.

Diganth is sometimes called "Doodhpedha" by his fans, referencing his popular role by that name.
Diganth married actress Aindrita Ray on 12 December 2018, after 10 years of courtship.

Career
Diganth made his debut in film Miss California but he gained fame for his supporting roles in Mungaru Male and Gaalipata.

His career after 2010 includes successful projects such as Manasaare, Pancharangi, Lifeu Ishtene and  Parijatha. All of these films brought him much popularity and stardom. He went on to play the lead in director Indrajith Lankesh's Dev Son of Mudde Gowda in 2012 which received mixed reactions.

He made his Bollywood debut in Wedding Pullav that was released on 16 October 2015.

In 2017, Diganth was part of Chowka which was a blockbuster hit. In that same year, he acted in Happy New Year for which he was nominated for SIMA best supporting role.

Under Pushkar films he acted in Katheyondu Shuruvagide, a romantic movie for which he was nominated for the SIIMA award for best actor. He also played a supporting role in Puneeth Rajkumar starrer Yuvaratnaa.

Later, he acted in suspense thriller movie Huttu Habbada Shubhashayagalu. He played a village boy role in Kshamisi Nimma Khateyalli Hanavilla.

He was also the part of Gaalipata 2 film where his "aghori" character was praised.

Filmography 
All films are in Kannada, unless otherwise noted.

Web Series

Awards
 2013 - SIIMA award for the Romantic Star of South Indian cinema.
 2018 - Nominated in SIIMA award for the best actor in Supporting role (movie- Happy new year).

References

External links
 

1983 births
Living people
People from Shimoga district
Indian male film actors
Kannada male actors
Male actors in Kannada cinema
Male actors in Hindi cinema
21st-century Indian male actors
Tulu people
Male actors in Telugu cinema